United Srpska (Serbian: Уједињена Српска/Ujedinjena Srpska or US) is a political party based in Republika Srpska, Bosnia and Herzegovina. A Serbian nationalist party, United Srpska was formed in December 2015 following a split from the Serb Democratic Party.

History
United Srpska president, Nenad Stevandić, formed the party after criticising the Serb Democratic Party for a perceived lack of sufficient nationalism, stating that its representatives on a national level have aimed to "destroy Republika Srpska". During the 9th convocation of the National Assembly of Republika Srpska, Stevandić was a part of the Free Democratic Serb Group, which comprised other right-wing SDS dissidents.

At the 2018 general election, US gained representation within the National Assembly in its own right for the first time. With 3.09% of the vote, the party had four deputies elected. In November 2018, it was announced that US would participate in the governing coalition, alongside SNSD, DNS, SP and NDP.

Natalija Trivić	became the party's first minister appointed to the Government of Republika Srpska, serving as Minister for Education and Culture since December 2018.

List of presidents

Electoral results

Parliamentary elections

Positions held
Major positions held by United Srpska members:

References

External links
Official Website

2005 establishments in Bosnia and Herzegovina
Conservative parties in Bosnia and Herzegovina
National conservative parties
Political parties established in 2005
Political parties in Republika Srpska
Serb political parties in Bosnia and Herzegovina